Martin M. Danggo is an Indian politician from the state of Meghalaya who serves as the current Minister of Public Works Department (Roads) in the Government of Meghalaya, and represents the 35th Ranikor Scheduled Tribe (ST) constituency in the South West Khasi Hills district in the Meghalaya Legislative Assembly. Danggo was first elected to the Assembly as a representative of the People's Democratic Movement (PDM) in the 1998 Assembly election for the Langrin (ST) constituency. He switched parties to the Indian National Congress and was re-elected in 2003. In 2018 he resigned from the INC and joined the National People's Party.

References

Indian National Congress politicians from Meghalaya
Living people
People from West Khasi Hills district
Meghalaya MLAs 2013–2018
Year of birth missing (living people)
State cabinet ministers of Meghalaya
Meghalaya MLAs 2018–2023
Meghalaya MLAs 1998–2003
Meghalaya MLAs 2003–2008
National People's Party (India) politicians
Garo people